Subligny is a commune in the Cher department in the Centre-Val de Loire region of France.

Geography

Population

Places of interest
 The church of St.Pierre and two chapels, dating from the fifteenth century.
 The sixteenth-century château de La Boulaye.
 An old tithe barn.
 A seventeenth-century stone cross in the cemetery.

See also
Communes of the Cher department

References

Communes of Cher (department)